WYYY (94.5 FM "Y94") is a commercial radio station licensed to Syracuse and serving Central New York.  It broadcasts an adult contemporary radio format, switching to all Christmas music for much of November and December.  It is owned by iHeartMedia and has its radio studios and offices on Plum Street in Syracuse along with sister stations WBBS, WHEN, WSYR, WSYR-FM and WWHT.  Evenings, WYYY carries Delilah, a call-in and dedications show, syndicated from co-owned Premiere Networks.  The station also carries the weekly syndicated Ellen K show on Saturday mornings.

While most area FM stations are limited to 50,000 watts or less, WYYY is grandfathered at an effective radiated power (ERP) of 100,000 watts.  The transmitter is on Sentinel Heights Road in Lafayette, New York, near Interstate 81.  WYYY broadcasts using HD Radio technology.  Its HD-2 digital subchannel runs an all-80s format known as "iHeart80s". The HD-3 subchannel runs "The Breeze," iHeart's soft adult contemporary music service.

History
In 1946, the station first signed on the air as WSYR-FM.  It mostly simulcast co-owned WSYR 570 AM.  From the late 1940s until the early 50s, WSYR-AM-FM were affiliates of the NBC Red Network, carrying its schedule of dramas, comedies, news, sports, soap operas, game shows and big band broadcasts during the "Golden Age of Radio."  But as network programming moved from radio to television, WSYR-AM-FM switched to a full service middle of the road format of popular music, news and sports.

In the late 1960s, the Federal Communications Commission encouraged AM-FM combo stations to offer separate programming.  WSYR-FM switched to an album-oriented rock (AOR) format, calling itself "94 Rock."  In 1983, it flipped to its current format of adult contemporary music, changing the call sign to WYYY.  The format change was quite a surprise as WSYR-FM was one of the top rated stations in Syracuse, playing rock music.  In fact, it was the first FM station to achieve double digit ratings.  But management thought an AC format was a better pairing for the AM station's advertising sales.
  
In 2007, the station somewhat tweaked the format, playing more soft rock and pop hits from the 1970s, 1980s and 1990s rather than mostly contemporary music. This was to distance itself from its one-time co-owned sister station, Hot AC WWDG 105.1.  WWDG was sold off to new owners in 2009. (As of now, 105.1 is part of the religious Family Life Network.)

References

External links
Y94 WYYY official website
CNYMedia's Syracuse FM history

YYY
Mainstream adult contemporary radio stations in the United States
Radio stations established in 1946
IHeartMedia radio stations